Grace Zabriskie (née Caplinger; born May 17, 1941) is an American actress. She is best known for her role as Sarah Palmer in Twin Peaks (1990–1991; 2017) and its film prequel Twin Peaks: Fire Walk with Me (1992), Lois Henrickson in Big Love, as well as in cult films such as two of David Lynch's films: Juana Durango in Wild at Heart (1990) and Visitor #1 in Inland Empire (2006). Other film roles include Nickel Mountain (1984), Child's Play 2 (1990), and The Grudge (2004). She also is known for her recurring roles in Seinfeld and Charmed.

Early life
Zabriskie was born in New Orleans, Louisiana, the daughter of Marion Grace (née Zabriskie), of Wyckoff, New Jersey, and Roger Thomas "Tom" Caplinger. Her mother had distant Polish and Dutch ancestry, and was a relative of James Zabriskie, a 19th-century railroad industrialist and early pioneer of California. Zabriskie has said that her family was visited by Tennessee Williams, Gore Vidal and Truman Capote during her childhood. Her father owned the famous French quarter gay bar Cafe Lafitte in Exile.

In the early 1960s, Zabriskie was among a circle of Kerry Thornley's New Orleans friends. At one point, Thornley began work on a novel about her titled Can Grace Come Out and Play? Thornley later claimed to have had an "eight-year-long, off-again-on-again, affair/friendship/rivalry/ego-game/karmic unraveling" with her, but Zabriskie described it as "four and a half minutes in bed" after a discussion on the exclusion of sex from their friendship—shared with Zabriskie's then-husband Rob—as being "irrational".

Her sister, Lane Caplinger, worked as a typist in New Orleans District Attorney Jim Garrison's office. Caplinger is reputed to have covertly produced all five copies of the first edition of the Principia Discordia in 1965.

Career
After making her major film debut in Norma Rae, Zabriskie went on to appear in dozens of other works, including the 1981 Roger Corman horror film Galaxy of Terror and the 1981 miniseries adaptation of John Steinbeck's East of Eden. She played the nanny in The Private Eyes, Debra Winger's mother in An Officer and a Gentleman, Heather Langenkamp's mother in Nickel Mountain, and Paul Le Mat's mother in The Burning Bed (starring Farrah Fawcett). She had a small but crucial part in the fifth season finale of Knots Landing.   

She appeared in 1989's Drugstore Cowboy and as the ill-fated orphanage owner Grace Poole in Child's Play 2. Other movies include the 1991 film adaptation Fried Green Tomatoes and Philip Ridley's 1995 film The Passion of Darkly Noon.

Zabriskie is perhaps most familiar for her television work. After a recurring role on the soap opera Santa Barbara, she appeared on David Lynch's Twin Peaks and its spin-off film, Twin Peaks: Fire Walk with Me as Sarah Palmer, the eerily psychic mother of the doomed Laura Palmer. 

Zabriskie also appeared in Lynch's Wild at Heart—notably as the twin sister of a character played by Isabella Rossellini, an actress eleven years her junior. David Lynch later cast her as a sinister Polish neighbor in Inland Empire in 2006. 

Zabriskie may best be remembered as Mrs. Ross, a recurring character on the sitcom Seinfeld. She played the mother of another doomed daughter, Susan Ross—George Costanza's fiancée—who died after licking cheap envelope adhesive when mailing out her wedding invitations. Zabriskie's character's husband on the series, who also appeared in a recurring role, was played by her former Twin Peaks co-star, Warren Frost.

She also made a brief but memorable appearance in the episode "S'ain't Valentine's" on the CBS sitcom The King of Queens, as the emotionally disturbed and alcoholic mother of Spence Olchin (played by Patton Oswalt). While the character Veronica Olchin would reappear throughout the series, Zabriskie would not portray her again, having been replaced by Anne Meara. She also starred as Lois Henrickson in Big Love, an HBO drama series that seriously explored the issue of polygamy, and appeared twice in Aaron Spelling's series Charmed as "The Crone".

She has worked in radio, collaborating with radio dramatist/monologist Joe Frank several times. In one episode of Frank's show, "Home (Original)", she talks at length about her childhood in New Orleans, with a focus on her father.

Zabriskie appeared in the 2004 American remake of The Grudge, in which she played a senile elderly woman sensitive to the paranormal occurrences in her home.

In 2020, she starred in the music video for Grouplove's "Youth". directed by Christopher Blauvelt.

Personal life
In her early 20s, Zabriskie and her then-husband Rob "had an intense friendship, which graduated, or from another point of view disintegrated into more of a friendship between" Zabriskie and Kerry Thornley; this friendship was "centered around an intense shared love for and fascination with the philosophy of Ayn Rand".

Zabriskie is the mother of two daughters: Helen, who became an actress, and Marion Lane, a painter. In 1993, Helen died of Hodgkin's disease. Marion died in 2019, aged 56, of cancer.

Filmography

|-
|1994
|Voyeur
|Margaret Hawke
|Actress (FMV)
|}

References

External links

  (Archive)
 

1941 births
American film actresses
American television actresses
20th-century American actresses
Living people
Actresses from New Orleans
American people of Dutch descent
American people of Polish descent
21st-century American actresses
American women aviators